Rolf Harlew Jenssen (1916—2008) was a Norwegian architect.

Rolf Harlew Jenssen was from Hammerfest, Norway, where he lived all his life, only interrupted by education from 1939 to 1943. After World War II from 1945 until 1955, he worked on church reconstruction since the retreating German army burned most churches in Finnmark. Jenssen was a district architect at the Norwegian State Housing Bank from 1967 to 1983, when he retired.

Rolf Harlew Jenssen was married to Gerd Mathea Jenssen (1928-2008). The parents were Anton Oluf Jensen (1872-1963) and Mathilde Gjertrude Isaksen (1886-1971).

Works
Breivikbotn Chapel
Indre Eidsfjord Church
Kokelv Church
Masi Church
Skallelv Chapel
Skarsvåg Church
Skoganvarre Chapel
Slotten Church

References

1916 births
2008 deaths
20th-century Norwegian architects
People from Hammerfest
Norwegian ecclesiastical architects